Ashbak (also Romanized as Ashbāk and Eshbāk; also known as Eshak and Ishāk) is a village in Meyghan Rural District, in the Central District of Nehbandan County, South Khorasan Province, Iran. At the 2006 census, its population was 57, in 15 families.

References 

Populated places in Nehbandan County